Prescription: Medicide is the second album release by Dutch Aggrotech band, Grendel. It was released in Europe on January 15, 2004, through NoiTekk Records and in the United States on October 8, 2004, through Metropolis Records.

Track listing

References

2004 albums
Grendel (band) albums